Andreja Prokić (born 9 April 1989) is a Serbian professional footballer who plays as a forward for Stal Rzeszów.

Career

As a youth player, Prokić trialed for Partizan as well as Red Star Belgrade, the most successful Serbian clubs. 

In 2010, he signed for Stal Rzeszów in the Polish third division from Serbian lower league side Turbina Vreoci.

In 2018, he signed for Stal Mielec in the Polish second division.

Personal life
In March 2018, Prokić received Polish citizenship.

Honours
Stal Rzeszów
II liga: 2021–22

References

External links
 
 

Living people
1989 births
Serbian footballers
Naturalized citizens of Poland
Association football midfielders
Association football wingers
Sportspeople from Kragujevac
Stal Mielec players
Ekstraklasa players
I liga players
II liga players
Stal Rzeszów players
GKS Katowice players
GKS Bełchatów players
FK Karađorđe Topola players
Serbian expatriate footballers
Serbian expatriate sportspeople in Poland
Expatriate footballers in Poland